Mit Herz und Handschellen is a German television series.

See also
 List of German television series

External links
 

2002 German television series debuts
2006 German television series endings
German crime television series
2000s German police procedural television series
German LGBT-related television shows
Television shows set in Munich
German-language television shows
Sat.1 original programming